is an enka singer and child actress. In 2008, she made her debut with the single  at the age of 10. In 2009, she received a "New Artist" award at the 51st Annual Japan Record Awards, becoming the youngest person to do so.

She also appeared as a special guest on the 60th Kōhaku Uta Gassen in the "children's Kōhaku" section of the program.

Biography 
Maya Sakura is the child of two successful restaurant owners. Her hobbies include reading. She began to learn to play the violin aged two and a half, and the piano aged three. She is also trained in ballet and solfège.

On 3 December 2008, she made her Nippon Crown debut with the song "Tairyō Matsuri", as the youngest enka singer in history. Three days later on 6 December, she sang at the Asakusa public gardens.

Due to her increasing popularity and busy work schedule, she transferred to a Tokyo school in 2009.

External links

References 

Enka singers
Japanese child actresses
1998 births
Living people
People from Obihiro, Hokkaido
Musicians from Hokkaido
21st-century Japanese singers
21st-century Japanese women singers